Mitras Station is a station on Line 1 of the Monterrey Metro. It is located in the intersection of Simón Bolívar and Ruiz Cortinez Avenues in Monterrey, México. This station is located in the Colon Avenue in the northeast side of the Monterrey Centre. The station was opened on 25 April 1991 as part of the inaugural section of Line 1, going from San Bernabé to Exposición.

This station serves the Mitras Norte and Bernardo Reyes neighborhoods (Colonias Mitras Norte y Bernardo Reyes).  It is accessible for people with disabilities.

This station is named after the Mitras neighborhood, and its logo represents the Cerro de las Mitras ('Miter Hill').

References

Metrorrey stations
Railway stations opened in 1991
1991 establishments in Mexico